Consolação may refer to:
 Consolação (district of São Paulo)
 Consolação (São Paulo Metro)
 Consolação, Minas Gerais
 Consolação, Rio de Janeiro